Robbinsdale School District 281 is a school district centered in Robbinsdale, Minnesota, in the northwestern suburbs of Minneapolis, Minnesota, USA.  The district includes all of Robbinsdale, Crystal, and New Hope, and parts of Brooklyn Center, Brooklyn Park, Plymouth, and Golden Valley.

Schools

Elementary schools
 Forest Elementary (Crystal)
 Lakeview Elementary (Robbinsdale)
 Meadow Lake Elementary (New Hope)
 Neill Elementary (Golden Valley)
 Noble Elementary (Golden Valley)
 Northport Elementary (Brooklyn Center)
 Sonnesyn Elementary (New Hope)
 Zachary Lane Elementary (Plymouth)
 School of Engineering and Arts (Golden Valley)

Magnet schools
 FAIR School Crystal, Grades 4-8 (located at FAIR School Crystal)
 FAIR School Pilgrim Lane, K-1 (located at Pilgrim Lane Elementary, Plymouth; grades K-3 to be offered by fall 2019) 
 Robbinsdale Spanish Immersion School or RSI (located at Sunny Hollow Elementary, New Hope)
 School of Engineering and Arts or SEA, (located at Olson Elementary, Golden Valley)

Middle schools
 Plymouth Middle School (Plymouth)
 Robbinsdale Middle School (Robbinsdale)
 Sandburg Middle School, (Golden Valley)
(closed in 2009, reopened in 2017)

High schools
 Highview Alternative Program (Golden Valley)
 Robbinsdale Armstrong High School, (Plymouth)
 Robbinsdale Cooper High School (New Hope)

Other facilities
 Education Service Center/Bus Garage, New Hope
 New Hope Learning Center, New Hope
 Robbinsdale Area Learning Campus (RALC), Robbinsdale
 Crystal Learning Center, Crystal
 Community Education at Pilgrim Lane, Plymouth

Closed Schools

Closed Elementary Schools
 Cavanagh Elementary, Crystal
(closed in 1977)
 Crystal Heights Elementary, Crystal
(closed in 1981)
 Fair Elementary (Adair Elementary), Crystal
(closed in 1978, now home to FAIR School)
 Lee Elementary, Robbinsdale
(closed in 1981, torn down and replaced by Lee Square a 55+ condominium complex)
 Lincoln Elementary, Brooklyn Park
(closed in 1995)
 New Hope Elementary, New Hope
(closed in 2005)
 Olson Elementary, Golden Valley
(closed in 1980, now home to School of Engineering and Arts)
 Pilgrim Lane Elementary, Plymouth
(closed in 2009, reopened as FAIR School Pilgrim Lane 2017)
 Sunny Hollow Elementary, New Hope
(closed in 2009, now home to Robbinsdale Spanish Immersion)
 Thorson Elementary, Crystal
(closed in 1977)
 Winnetka Elementary, New Hope
(closed in 1978)

Closed Middle Schools and High Schools

 Hosterman Middle School, New Hope (closed in 2000)
 Robbinsdale High School, Robbinsdale (became Robbinsdale Middle School in 1982)
 Robbinsdale Junior High, Robbinsdale (closed in 1979, hosted Technology Learning Campus beginning in 1984, demolished in 2005)

See also

List of school districts in Minnesota

References

External links
 Robbinsdale Area Schools - Home Page

Suburban Minneapolis School Districts
Education in Hennepin County, Minnesota